Lamprostola nitens is a moth of the subfamily Arctiinae. It was described by George Hampson in 1900. It is found in Bolivia.

References

 

Lithosiini
Moths described in 1900